Gymnastics at the 2001 Southeast Asian Games was divided into two sub-categories: artistic gymnastics, and rhythmic gymnastics. The artistic gymnastics was held from September 8 to September 12, and the rhythmic gymnastics from September 14 to September 16. All events were held at the Putra Indoor Stadium National Sports Complex, in Kuala Lumpur, Malaysia.

Malaysia, the host country, was the most successful nation, winning sixteen gold medals out of twenty and twenty-seven medals in total. Thailand and Indonesia each won two gold medals, with both country won twelve medals in total. The Philippines and Vietnam respectively won six and three medals overall.

Malaysia had a sweep of women's artistic gymnastics events and Rhythmic gymnastics and dominated men's artistic gymnastics events. Malaysian team won its first ever gold in the men's team even and won four gold medals in total. Several athletes won multiple individual golds medals, veteran Jonathan Sianturi won two gold medals for Indonesia on Individual all-around and Pommel horse. Nurul Fatiha Abdul Hamid of Malaysia won women's Individual all-around and Floor exercise events. Chang Zhi Wei of Malaysia won women's Uneven bars and Balance beam events. Goh Yi Wei and Celestie Chan of Malaysia swept all individual gold medals on Rhythmic gymnastics. Goh won Individual all-around, clubs, and hoop events and Chan won ball, and rope events respectively.

Medalist

Artistic gymnastics

Men's events

Women's events

Rhythmic gymnastics

Medal table
Legend

References

External links
 

2001
Southeast Asian Games
2001 Southeast Asian Games events
International gymnastics competitions hosted by Malaysia